Qari Sahib Hafizullah Pahlawan is an Afghan Taliban politician who is currently serving as Governor of Faryab province since 7 November 2021.

References

Living people
Year of birth missing (living people)
Taliban governors
Governors of Faryab Province